Alf Hansen (25 August 1899 – 26 April 1988) was a Norwegian footballer. He played in one match for the Norway national football team in 1926.

References

External links
 

1899 births
1988 deaths
Norwegian footballers
Norway international footballers
Place of birth missing
Association footballers not categorized by position